is a professional Japanese baseball player. He plays catcher for the Tokyo Yakult Swallows.

References 

1993 births
Living people
Baseball people from Kagawa Prefecture
Japanese baseball players
Nippon Professional Baseball catchers
Tokyo Yakult Swallows players